The Investigation (Danish: Efterforskningen) is a six-part series, directed by Tobias Lindholm. The series is based on the investigation of the death of Kim Wall, a 30-year-old Swedish journalist. The series follows the criminal investigation of the case, featuring  Søren Malling as Chief Inspector Jens Møller, Laura Christensen as Police Investigator Maibritt Porse, Pilou Asbæk as Special Prosecutor Jakob Buch-Jepsen and Rolf Lassgård and Pernilla August as Wall's parents. The series originally aired on 28 September 2020 on TV2 in Denmark and Sweden's SVT. It was broadcast on UK'S BBC Two between 22 January and 5 February 2021. HBO began showing the series on 1 February 2021.

Cast
Søren Malling as chief investigator Jens Møller Jansen
Pilou Asbæk as special prosecutor Jakob Buch-Jepsen
Pernilla August as Ingrid Wall (victim’s mother)
Rolf Lassgård as Joachim Wall (victim’s father)
Laura Christensen as investigator Maibritt Porse
Hans Henrik Clemensen as investigator Nikolaj Storm
Dulfi Al-Jabouri as investigator Musa Amin
Charlotte Munck as Kirstine (Jens Møller Jansen’s wife)
Anders Juul as investigator Christian Skov
Henrik Birch as investigator Lars Møller

See also
 Murder of Kim Wall

References

Danish crime television series
2020 Danish television series debuts
Television shows set in Denmark
True crime television series
Peter Madsen
DR TV original programming
Sveriges Television original programming